Blood is a 2012 thriller film directed by Nick Murphy and written by Bill Gallagher. The plot is about two brothers who are policemen and charts the moral collapse of a police family. The two brothers, played by Paul Bettany (Joe Fairburn) and Stephen Graham (Christie Fairburn) must investigate a despicable crime in a small town, in the shadow of their former police chief father.

The film is a cinematic remake of the 2004 BBC television mini series Conviction, which Gallagher also wrote.

Plot
While trying to solve a vicious murder in a small town, two detectives Joe (Paul Bettany) and Chrissie (Stephen Graham) wind up murdering the suspected perpetrator. What follows brings them on a journey through fear and drives them to turn on each other. All whilst under the gaze of their police force colleague, Robert (Mark Strong). The investigation and ultimate crime turns their lives into a downward spiral of guilt and paranoia.

Cast
Paul Bettany as Joe Fairburn
Mark Strong as Robert Seymour
Stephen Graham as Chrissie Fairburn
Brian Cox as Lanny Fairburn
Naomi Battrick as Miriam Fairburn
Ben Crompton as Jason Buleigh
Natasha Little as Lily Fairburn
Zoë Tapper as Jemma Vern
Adrian Edmondson as Tom Tiernan
Nick Murphy as Sports Master
Patrick Hurd-Wood as Dominic
Daniel Pemberton as Drunken Guitarist
Stuart McQuarrie as David Saddler
Sandra Voe as Sandra Buleigh
Brooklyn Baker as CID Officer
Jenna Sheehy as Running Girl 3
Faye Morrison as Race Winner

References

External links

BBC Film films
2012 films
British thriller films
2012 thriller films
Films scored by Daniel Pemberton
2010s English-language films
2010s British films